Ricardo Williams Jr. (born June 25, 1981) is an American professional boxer. Williams won a Light Welterweight Silver Medal at the 2000 Olympic Games, and turned pro in the following year and was immediately dubbed as a future star in the sport and the best fighter to come out of the 2000 games.

Amateur career 
Williams began boxing at the age of eight, taking after his father, a Vietnam War veteran who had over 80 amateur bouts of his own. He had a stellar amateur career.  His highlights include:
1998 United States Amateur Light welterweight champion
1998 National Golden Gloves Light welterweight champion
1999 United States Amateur Light welterweight champion
Represented the United States as a Light welterweight at the 2000 Sydney Olympic games, winning a silver medal. His results were:
Defeated Henry Collins (Australia) RSC 4
Defeated Ajose Olusegun (Nigeria) RSC 4
Defeated Aleksandr Leonov (Russia) 17-12
Defeated Diógenes Luña (Cuba) 42-41
Lost to Mohamad Abdulaev (Uzbekistan) 20-27

Professional career
Known as "Slicky Ricky", Williams was an extremely talented fighter with power in both fists, but quickly become known for his uninspired performances as a pro.  Two years after turning pro, Williams tendency to undertrain hurt him severely, as he dropped a unanimous decision to unheralded Juan Valenzuela.  The following year, fighting 11 pounds higher than when he had turned pro, Williams turned in yet another disappointing performance against journeyman Manning Galloway, and lost a split decision.

Troubles outside the ring
Rather than going on to win the expected title belt, in 2005 Williams had a serious run in with the law which brought any title dreams crashing down.  He was sentenced to three years in prison for his part in a conspiracy to distribute cocaine shipped to Cincinnati via FedEx. 
  This charge was a crushing blow to Cincinnati sports fans, who recently had another boxing titlist and former Olympian, Tim Austin, charged with serious crimes.

Return to boxing
After serving 31 months of his sentence, Williams was released from prison and resumed his boxing training.  He won 9 in a row, beginning with a June 2008 stoppage of Sebastian Hamel in just 91 seconds of a welterweight bout, before Williams faced Carson Jones for the USBA welterweight title. Jones knocked Williams down once in the third round and twice in the fourth before the fight was waved off by referee Steve Smoger. Williams added two more wins to his record in 2012 and another in 2014 before retiring at 22–3.

References

External links
 

1981 births
Winners of the United States Championship for amateur boxers
Living people
Boxers from Cincinnati
Olympic boxers of the United States
Boxers at the 2000 Summer Olympics
Olympic silver medalists for the United States in boxing
Light-welterweight boxers
American male boxers
Medalists at the 2000 Summer Olympics